Albert Hassler (2 November 1903 – 22 September 1994) was a French ice hockey player and speed skater.

Career
Hassler played for the France men's national ice hockey team at the 1924 Winter Olympics in Chamonix, the 1928 Winter Olympics in St. Moritz, and at the 1936 Winter Olympics in Garmisch-Partenkirchen. He also finished 18th in the 500 meters speed skating event at the 1924 Games.

He also played for the French national team at the Ice Hockey European Championships in 1923  and 1924, winning a silver medal at the 1923 event and a gold medal in 1924.

The award for the most valuable French player in the Ligue Magnus, the Albert Hassler Trophy is named after him. In 2009, he was inducted into the French Ice Hockey Hall of Fame. His daughter Nicole Hassler became an Olympic figure skater.

References

1903 births
1994 deaths
French male speed skaters
Ice hockey players at the 1924 Winter Olympics
Ice hockey players at the 1928 Winter Olympics
Ice hockey players at the 1936 Winter Olympics
Olympic ice hockey players of France
Olympic speed skaters of France
People from Chamonix
Speed skaters at the 1924 Winter Olympics
Sportspeople from Haute-Savoie